Jacques Testard de Montigny (1663–1737) was an officer in the French Marines in Canada.

Biography
Born in Montreal into a merchant family, Montigny first saw military action as a volunteer on the expedition against Schenectady in 1690.  Two years later he went to France with Pierre Le Moyne d'Iberville, and was in 1693 stationed the capital of Acadia, Fort Nashwaak, where he led the local Abenaki and Mi'kmaq in raids against the English  (See Battle of Fundy Bay.)While posted there he also engaged in trade and commerce, sometimes in conflict with his military duties.

In 1696 Montigny was on d'Iberville's expedition against Pemaquid, an English fort on the northern frontier with Acadia.  In this action he began a close association with the Abenaki war leader Escumbuit, who also joined Montigny on d'Iberville's Newfoundland campaign later in 1696, in which most of the English settlements on Newfoundland were destroyed.  Montigny was given an independent command by d'Iberville, in which he traveled along the coast, destroying settlements and fishing stages as he went.  Despite the destructive nature of the expedition, it had no long-lasting implications, as the English quickly returned, rebuilding and fortifying some of the settlements.

Montigny was promoted to lieutenant in 1700.  In 1704 he was sent back to Acadia, where he helped orchestrate raids against English settlements, and worked to convince the Abenakis to resettle closer to French settlements.  In the winter of 1704/5 he brought a band of Abenakis to Newfoundland, where they attempted to repeated d'Iberville's 1696 expedition under the direction of Daniel d'Auger de Subercase.  They once again destroyed a number of English settlements, but were unable to capture St. John's, the English capital.

In 1706 Montigny went to France with Escumbuit, where they were received by King Louis XIV.  He was a member of an expedition sent in 1709 to dispute a possible English advance on Lake Champlain.  The English never reached beyond the southern end of the lake, and the only action was a brief skirmish near Crown Point.  He was awarded the Order of Saint Louis in 1712, and in 1721 was given command of a frontier fort on Green Bay, where he maintained good relations with the Fox, and was visited by his friend Escumbuit.  By 1726 he had returned to Montreal, and in 1730 he was made commandant of Fort Michilimackinac, a post he held for three years before finally retiring.

He died in Montreal in 1737.  He was twice married, and had seven children.

See also 
 Casimir-Amable Testard de Montigny, his great-grandson
 Portraits of Jacques Testard de Montigny, his wife, son and daughter-in-law
Military history of Nova Scotia

References

1663 births
1737 deaths
People of New France
French military personnel of the Nine Years' War
French military personnel of the War of the Spanish Succession
Order of Saint Louis recipients